Sharada Mandir School is a private nursery to higher secondary co-educational school in Miramar, Panaji, Goa, India. It was established in 1966 and affiliated to the Council for the Indian School Certificate Examinations.The school follows the Indian Certificate of Secondary Education (ICSE) up till Std.10 and is now affiliated with the Indian School Certificate for Std. 12. In the late 2000s, the school was acquired by the industrialist Dattaraj V. Salgaocar (son of Vasudev Salgaocar), who now heads the Board of Trustees as well as the Managing Committee along with his wife Dipti (daughter of Dhirubhai Ambani) and their daughter Isheta (sister-in-law of Nirav Modi).

The school has a wide range of equipment and facilities, ranging from playgrounds, sand pits and yoga rooms to auditoriums and special-education centres. It also hosts events like the biennial EKTA gathering.

References 

High schools and secondary schools in Goa
Private schools in Goa
Education in North Goa district
Educational institutions established in 1966
1966 establishments in Goa, Daman and Diu